The Braille pattern dots-124 is a 6-dot braille cell with the two top dots and middle left dot raised, or an 8-dot braille cell with both top dots and the upper-middle left dot raised. It is represented by the Unicode code point U+280b, and in Braille ASCII with F.

Unified Braille

In unified international braille, the braille pattern dots-124 is used to represent unvoiced labial fricatives, such as /f/ and /ɸ/, and is otherwise assigned as needed. It is also used for the number 6.

Table of unified braille values

Other braille

Plus dots 7 and 8

Related to Braille pattern dots-124 are Braille patterns 1247, 1248, and 12478, which are used in 8-dot braille systems, such as Gardner-Salinas and Luxembourgish Braille.

Related 8-dot kantenji patterns

In the Japanese kantenji braille, the standard 8-dot Braille patterns 235, 1235, 2345, and 12345 are the patterns related to Braille pattern dots-124, since the two additional dots of kantenji patterns 0124, 1247, and 01247 are placed above the base 6-dot cell, instead of below, as in standard 8-dot braille.

Kantenji using braille patterns 235, 1235, 2345, or 12345

This listing includes kantenji using Braille pattern dots-124 for all 6349 kanji found in JIS C 6226-1978.

  - 言

Variants and thematic compounds

  -  selector 3 + え/訁  =  云
  -  selector 4 + え/訁  =  亦
  -  selector 5 + え/訁  =  叟
  -  selector 6 + え/訁  =  袁
  -  数 + え/訁/#6  =  六
  -  比 + え/訁  =  高

Compounds of 言

  -  す/発 + え/訁  =  詈
  -  龸 + え/訁  =  誉
  -  龸 + 龸 + え/訁  =  譽
  -  ら/月 + え/訁  =  謄
  -  な/亻 + え/訁  =  信
  -  仁/亻 + え/訁  =  儲
  -  え/訁 + て/扌  =  訂
  -  え/訁 + と/戸  =  訃
  -  え/訁 + ろ/十  =  計
  -  え/訁 + し/巿  =  討
  -  す/発 + え/訁 + し/巿  =  罸
  -  え/訁 + な/亻  =  託
  -  え/訁 + き/木  =  記
  -  え/訁 + め/目  =  訝
  -  え/訁 + ほ/方  =  訪
  -  え/訁 + の/禾  =  設
  -  え/訁 + そ/馬  =  許
  -  に/氵 + え/訁 + そ/馬  =  滸
  -  え/訁 + へ/⺩  =  註
  -  え/訁 + さ/阝  =  詐
  -  え/訁 + ぬ/力  =  詔
  -  え/訁 + り/分  =  評
  -  え/訁 + 仁/亻  =  詞
  -  え/訁 + せ/食  =  話
  -  え/訁 + け/犬  =  誇
  -  え/訁 + を/貝  =  誓
  -  え/訁 + は/辶  =  誕
  -  え/訁 + ゐ/幺  =  誘
  -  え/訁 + ひ/辶  =  誠
  -  え/訁 + こ/子  =  誤
  -  え/訁 + 宿  =  説
  -  え/訁 + つ/土  =  読
  -  え/訁 + い/糹/#2  =  誰
  -  え/訁 + た/⽥  =  課
  -  え/訁 + 火  =  談
  -  え/訁 + れ/口  =  諒
  -  え/訁 + る/忄  =  論
  -  え/訁 + よ/广  =  諜
  -  え/訁 + ま/石  =  諦
  -  え/訁 + ゆ/彳  =  諭
  -  え/訁 + う/宀/#3  =  諺
  -  え/訁 + 数  =  諾
  -  え/訁 + 氷/氵  =  謁
  -  く/艹 + え/訁 + 氷/氵  =  藹
  -  え/訁 + ⺼  =  謂
  -  え/訁 + み/耳  =  謝
  -  え/訁 + か/金  =  謡
  -  え/訁 + え/訁 + か/金  =  謠
  -  え/訁 + も/門  =  謳
  -  え/訁 + 日  =  識
  -  え/訁 + ふ/女  =  譜
  -  え/訁 + 囗  =  議
  -  え/訁 + く/艹  =  護
  -  え/訁 + こ/子 + selector 1  =  訌
  -  え/訁 + 仁/亻 + ふ/女  =  誣
  -  え/訁 + 宿 + か/金  =  訐
  -  え/訁 + 龸 + お/頁  =  訖
  -  え/訁 + 仁/亻 + 比  =  訛
  -  え/訁 + 囗 + 仁/亻  =  訥
  -  え/訁 + 比 + か/金  =  訶
  -  え/訁 + れ/口 + ろ/十  =  詁
  -  え/訁 + selector 1 + ん/止  =  詆
  -  え/訁 + 宿 + ひ/辶  =  詑
  -  え/訁 + selector 4 + な/亻  =  詒
  -  え/訁 + selector 5 + そ/馬  =  詛
  -  え/訁 + 日 + す/発  =  詢
  -  え/訁 + よ/广 + れ/口  =  詬
  -  え/訁 + く/艹 + さ/阝  =  詭
  -  え/訁 + よ/广 + 火  =  詼
  -  え/訁 + き/木 + な/亻  =  誄
  -  え/訁 + selector 5 + か/金  =  誅
  -  え/訁 + け/犬 + へ/⺩  =  誑
  -  え/訁 + そ/馬 + ⺼  =  誚
  -  え/訁 + と/戸 + 囗  =  誡
  -  え/訁 + こ/子 + く/艹  =  誥
  -  え/訁 + 宿 + つ/土  =  誦
  -  え/訁 + み/耳 + ゑ/訁  =  諏
  -  え/訁 + う/宀/#3 + そ/馬  =  誼
  -  え/訁 + 宿 + ぬ/力  =  諂
  -  え/訁 + 龸 + こ/子  =  諄
  -  え/訁 + そ/馬 + 宿  =  諍
  -  え/訁 + う/宀/#3 + よ/广  =  諚
  -  え/訁 + 宿 + へ/⺩  =  諞
  -  え/訁 + う/宀/#3 + 日  =  諠
  -  え/訁 + 宿 + も/門  =  諡
  -  え/訁 + 宿 + む/車  =  諢
  -  え/訁 + 宿 + け/犬  =  諤
  -  え/訁 + 比 + 日  =  諧
  -  え/訁 + 宿 + い/糹/#2  =  諱
  -  え/訁 + む/車 + 宿  =  諷
  -  え/訁 + か/金 + ん/止  =  謌
  -  え/訁 + ひ/辶 + の/禾  =  謎
  -  え/訁 + 心 + selector 5  =  謐
  -  え/訁 + す/発 + か/金  =  謔
  -  え/訁 + 宿 + た/⽥  =  謖
  -  え/訁 + り/分 + ⺼  =  謚
  -  え/訁 + み/耳 + の/禾  =  謦
  -  え/訁 + 宿 + く/艹  =  謨
  -  え/訁 + 宿 + お/頁  =  謫
  -  え/訁 + む/車 + selector 2  =  謬
  -  え/訁 + 龸 + ま/石  =  謾
  -  え/訁 + く/艹 + か/金  =  譁
  -  え/訁 + 龸 + 火  =  譌
  -  え/訁 + selector 1 + よ/广  =  譎
  -  え/訁 + ゐ/幺 + 囗  =  譏
  -  え/訁 + 龸 + 日  =  譖
  -  え/訁 + 日 + ろ/十  =  譚
  -  え/訁 + 日 + け/犬  =  譛
  -  え/訁 + れ/口 + う/宀/#3  =  譟
  -  え/訁 + 宿 + 日  =  譫
  -  え/訁 + 宿 + ま/石  =  譬
  -  え/訁 + は/辶 + ら/月  =  譴
  -  え/訁 + を/貝 + け/犬  =  讃
  -  え/訁 + 龸 + つ/土  =  讌
  -  え/訁 + ぬ/力 + 宿  =  讒
  -  え/訁 + 宿 + み/耳  =  讖
  -  え/訁 + 龸 + け/犬  =  讙
  -  え/訁 + 宿 + を/貝  =  讚
  -  え/訁 + と/戸 + ろ/十  =  鞫
  -  え/訁 + え/訁 + 心  =  戀
  -  え/訁 + え/訁 + む/車  =  蠻
  -  え/訁 + え/訁 + つ/土  =  讀
  -  え/訁 + え/訁 + す/発  =  變
  -  や/疒 + う/宀/#3 + え/訁  =  巒
  -  え/訁 + 宿 + て/扌  =  攣
  -  え/訁 + 宿 + き/木  =  欒
  -  え/訁 + 宿 + ⺼  =  臠
  -  か/金 + 宿 + え/訁  =  鑾
  -  え/訁 + 宿 + せ/食  =  鸞

Compounds of 云

  -  り/分 + え/訁  =  会
  -  い/糹/#2 + え/訁  =  絵
  -  こ/子 + え/訁  =  耘
  -  く/艹 + え/訁  =  芸
  -  く/艹 + く/艹 + え/訁  =  藝
  -  れ/口 + く/艹 + え/訁  =  囈
  -  え/訁 + に/氵  =  魂
  -  ち/竹 + え/訁  =  雲
  -  い/糹/#2 + ち/竹 + え/訁  =  繧
  -  い/糹/#2 + 宿 + え/訁  =  紜

Compounds of 六 and 亦

  -  う/宀/#3 + 数 + え/訁  =  宍
  -  え/訁 + す/発  =  変
  -  え/訁 + 心  =  恋
  -  え/訁 + む/車  =  蛮
  -  み/耳 + え/訁  =  跡
  -  え/訁 + 比 + け/犬  =  奕
  -  ひ/辶 + 宿 + え/訁  =  迹

Compounds of 叟

  -  て/扌 + え/訁  =  捜
  -  て/扌 + て/扌 + え/訁  =  搜
  -  や/疒 + え/訁  =  痩
  -  ふ/女 + selector 5 + え/訁  =  嫂
  -  に/氵 + 宿 + え/訁  =  溲
  -  ふ/女 + 宿 + え/訁  =  艘

Compounds of 袁

  -  囗 + え/訁  =  園
  -  く/艹 + 囗 + え/訁  =  薗
  -  け/犬 + え/訁  =  猿
  -  ひ/辶 + え/訁  =  遠
  -  む/車 + 宿 + え/訁  =  轅

Compounds of 高

  -  の/禾 + え/訁  =  稿
  -  ゐ/幺 + え/訁  =  縞
  -  ⺼ + え/訁  =  膏
  -  れ/口 + 比 + え/訁  =  嚆
  -  つ/土 + 比 + え/訁  =  塙
  -  や/疒 + 比 + え/訁  =  嵩
  -  は/辶 + 比 + え/訁  =  敲
  -  き/木 + 比 + え/訁  =  槁
  -  そ/馬 + 比 + え/訁  =  犒
  -  の/禾 + 比 + え/訁  =  稾
  -  心 + 比 + え/訁  =  蒿
  -  か/金 + 比 + え/訁  =  鎬
  -  う/宀/#3 + 比 + え/訁  =  髞

Other compounds

  -  え/訁 + ん/止  =  円
  -  え/訁 + え/訁 + ん/止  =  圓
  -  う/宀/#3 + え/訁  =  寅
  -  氷/氵 + え/訁  =  演
  -  ま/石 + え/訁  =  商
  -  ね/示 + え/訁  =  裔
  -  に/氵 + え/訁  =  沿
  -  ふ/女 + え/訁  =  船
  -  か/金 + え/訁  =  鉛
  -  囗 + 宿 + え/訁  =  冏
  -  き/木 + え/訁  =  柄
  -  ゆ/彳 + え/訁  =  衛
  -  ゆ/彳 + ゆ/彳 + え/訁  =  衞
  -  せ/食 + え/訁  =  餌
  -  そ/馬 + え/訁  =  駸
  -  り/分 + り/分 + え/訁  =  會
  -  け/犬 + り/分 + え/訁  =  獪
  -  ⺼ + り/分 + え/訁  =  膾
  -  く/艹 + り/分 + え/訁  =  薈
  -  せ/食 + り/分 + え/訁  =  鱠
  -  い/糹/#2 + い/糹/#2 + え/訁  =  繪

Notes

Braille patterns